Məmmədxanlı (known as İlxıçı or İlxıçı-Məmmədxan until 2015) is a village in the Khachmaz Rayon of Azerbaijan.  The village forms part of the municipality of Sayad.

References 

Populated places in Khachmaz District